Paul Edward Waldschmidt CSC (January 7, 1920 – October 20, 1994) was an American prelate of the Catholic Church who served as an auxiliary bishop of the Archdiocese of Portland in Oregon from 1978 to 1990.

Biography
Born in Evansville, Indiana (U.S.), he graduated from the University of Notre Dame in 1942. Waldschmidt was ordained to the priesthood on June 24, 1944, for the Congregation of Holy Cross. From 1962 to 1978, Waldschmidt served as president of the University of Portland. In 1969, Waldschmidt was elected as a member of the board of trustees and as a member of the Fellows of the University of Notre Dame.

On November 28, 1977, he was appointed titular bishop of Citium and auxiliary bishop of the Archdiocese of Portland in Oregon. He was consecrated on March 2, 1978. Waldschmidt resigned on January 8, 1990.

In 1992, Waldschmidt Hall, the main administration building of the University of Portland, was named for the former president of the university.

He died on October 20, 1994.

References

1920 births
1994 deaths
People from Evansville, Indiana
University of Notre Dame alumni
20th-century American Roman Catholic titular bishops
University of Portland people
Congregation of Holy Cross bishops
Roman Catholic Archdiocese of Portland in Oregon
Catholics from Indiana